Eric Daniel Aparicio (born 25 January 1990 in Glew, Buenos Aires) is an Argentine footballer who plays as a striker.

External links
 Argentine Primera statistics 
 

1990 births
Living people
Argentine footballers
Argentine expatriate footballers
Association football forwards
Club Atlético Lanús footballers
Tiro Federal footballers
C.D. Jorge Wilstermann players
Club Atlético Brown footballers
San Martín de San Juan footballers
Defensa y Justicia footballers
Barracas Central players
San Telmo footballers
Chacarita Juniors footballers
Club Atlético Los Andes footballers
Argentine Primera División players
Primera Nacional players
Primera B Metropolitana players
Bolivian Primera División players
Footballers from Buenos Aires
Expatriate footballers in Bolivia
Argentine expatriate sportspeople in Bolivia